The Jasper Ridge Biological Preserve is a  nature preserve and biological field station formally established as a reserve in 1973. It is used by students, researchers, and docents to conduct biology research, and teach the community about the importance of that research. The preserve encompasses Jasper Ridge and Searsville Lake (actually a reservoir) and the upper reaches of San Francisquito Creek, along with the latter's Corte Madera Creek and Bear Creek tributaries.

Geology

Jasper Ridge is part of the foothills northeast of the Santa Cruz Mountains and is bounded by San Francisquito Creek, Corte Madera Creek and Los Trancos Creek, although the preserve occupies only the northwestern half of the ridge. The hilly mass runs about ten kilometers from northwest to southeast and about half that in width.

Serpentine (Serpentinite) is the California State Rock. It was formed from deep sea or mantle rocks. This rock was squeezed toward the surface by tectonic plate movement, and thus feels greasy, as it has been polished over millions of years. Graywacke Sandstone after crossing Leonard's Bridge. This sandstone was part of the Franciscan formation 138 million years ago. Some rocks found at the preserve include: Greenstone, Chert, Serpentinite, Sandstone.

Ecology
In 1922, Cooper asserted that Jasper Ridge was historically chaparral, and cleared in the nineteenth century to open grasslands, primarily Eurasian wild oats (Avena fatua and Avena barbata). However much of the grassland has been replaced by various oaks, especially Coast Live Oak (Quercus agrifolia), and Pacific Madrone (Arbutus menziesii). More recently, the oak/madrone forest is being succeeded by specimens of large Douglas fir (Pseudotsuga menziesii) as in the image above. In addition there are several groves of second growth Coast Redwoods (Sequoia sempervirens) in the preserve, some in large "fairy rings" indicating that trees of immense girth were cut down in the nineteenth century.

Academic studies
Numerous academic studies and ecological experiments are conducted at Jasper Ridge.

Global change experiment
The Global Change Experiment studies the response of California annual grassland to global change, including elevated atmospheric CO2, temperature, altered precipitation, and increased nitrogen deposition.

Argentine ant invasion
This project studies and tracks the Argentine ants, an invasive species.

Bat monitoring
A station near the lake monitors bats at night, by converting and recording bat sounds (ultrasonic echolocation).

See also
Organization of Biological Field Stations

References

External links
Official  Jasper Ridge website
Organization of Biological Field Stations

Stanford University
Nature reserves in California
Ecological restoration
Ecology organizations
Ecological experiments
Biological stations
Protected areas of San Mateo County, California